Paola Testa (born 27 May 1969) is a former Italian female long-distance runner and cross-country runner who competed at individual senior level at the World Athletics Cross Country Championships (1996).

References

External links
 

1969 births
Living people
Italian female long-distance runners
Italian female cross country runners
Sportspeople from Lecco